8 Mobile Hospital (8 Mob Hosp) was a mobile hospital in the South African Medical Service (SAMS), part of the South African Defence Force (SADF). As a Citizen Force unit, it was roughly equivalent to a Clinical Wing in the current medical battalion in the SANDF or a mobile field hospital. The unit was based in Pretoria in the Transvaal province of South Africa.

Structure 

The command structure of the unit was composed of an Officer Commanding, a Regimental Sergeant Major, a Chaplain and an Adjutant.

Equipment

Weaponry 

The main personal weapon of operationally deployed members of the unit was the R1 Assault Rifle, whilst Warrant Officers and Officers were usually issued with a 9mm pistol as a personal sidearm. 

 South African military ranks

Disbanding 

8 Mobile Hospital was disbanded on 5 November 1981, when the majority of the serving and active members were incorporated into 6 Medical Battalion Group.

See also

References 

Military medical units and formations of South Africa
Disbanded military units and formations in Pretoria
Military units and formations of South Africa in the Border War
Military units and formations established in 1972
Military units and formations disestablished in 1981